The following list includes most of the roles which were created by the leading French hautes-contre of the 17th and 18th centuries, or at least those to be found in operas by the major composers of the same period. The table was compiled by collating data from the sources listed at the bottom of the page, either printed or online, and makes no pretence at being exhaustive. Rather, its purpose is to provide an outline of a significant period in French operatic singing: it extends chronologically from Bernard Clédière to Joseph Legros.


Sources and references

Bibliography
 Bouissou, Sylvie; Denécheau, Pascal; and Marchal-Ninosque, France (edition directors), Dictionnaire de l'Opéra de Paris sous l'Ancien Régime (1669–1791), Paris, Classiques Garnier, 2019, tome I (A–C),  
Cyr, Mary, "On performing 18th-century Haute-Contre Roles", Musical Times, vol 118, 1997, pp 291–5, later reproduced in Cyr, M., Essays on the Performance of Baroque Music. Opera and Chamber Music in France and England, Ashgate Variorum, Aldeshot (UK)/Burlington, VT (USA), 2008,  (essay no. IX)
 Pitou, Spire, The Paris Opéra. An Encyclopedia of Operas, Ballets, Composers, and Performers – Genesis and Glory, 1671–1715, Greenwood Press, Westport/London, 1983
 Pitou, Spire, The Paris Opéra. An Encyclopedia of Operas, Ballets, Composers, and Performers – Rococo and Romantic, 1715–1815, Greenwood Press, Westport/London, 1985
 Sadie, Stanley (ed.), The New Grove Dictionary of Opera, Grove (Oxford University Press), New York, 1997

Online sources
 Le magazine de l'opéra baroque 
 
 Parfaict Dictionnaire (1767) 
 Psyché, édition critique établie par Luke Arnason 

French haute-contre
Haute-contre